Seren Robert Waters (born 11 April 1990 in Nairobi, Kenya) is a former Kenyan cricketer who plays for Surrey and Kenya. He is a skillful and bold opening batsman, who loves to face the first ball. He is strong off his legs and through the covers and his favourite shot is the pull shot.

School times
He was born and lives in Kenya but has British nationality. Since Kenya is only an associate member of the ICC, Waters is also eligible to play for England. He was educated at Cranleigh School, England and captained the first XI cricket side for two years, playing alongside Stuart Meaker. In his last season at Cranleigh School, he finished with almost 900 runs.

He is a very able leg spinner and in his last season at Cranleigh School was second highest wicket taker.

Domestic career
He scored a double century on debut for Surrey Under-17s in 2006, and in 2008 he made his Surrey second XI debut.

International career
In October 2008 he was called into the Kenyan Cricket team, and made an immediate impression, scoring 75 against Ireland in the Intercontinental Cup at the Gymkhana in Nairobi, and more recently 74 against South Africa at Kimberley in a full One Day International (ODI).

Waters is also a very apt fielder and took two astonishing catches in the second ODI against South Africa, that belied his age and experience, to send Gibbs and then de Villiers back to the pavilion.

Aside from playing for Surrey and Kenya, Waters also plays for the Old Cranleighan Cricket Club and for Weybridge Cricket Club. Waters went to Durham University and was named in the Kenyan squad for the 2011 ICC Cricket World Cup.

References

1990 births
Living people
People educated at Cranleigh School
Kenyan cricketers
Kenyan people of English descent
White Kenyan people
Kenya One Day International cricketers
Cricketers at the 2011 Cricket World Cup
Durham MCCU cricketers
Alumni of St Cuthbert's Society, Durham